Andrew Jameson may refer to:

Andrew Jameson, Lord Ardwall (1845–1911), Scottish barrister and judge
Andrew Jameson (politician) (1855–1941), Irish politician, businessman and public servant
Andy Jameson (born 1965), English swimmer and sports commentator

See also
Andrew Jamieson, Scottish engineer and academic author